Fairholme Farm was built in 1894 in Canada by renowned architect George Franklin Barber. It was built on land originally purchased from the Crown in 1827.  Built in the style of Queen Anne style architecture it is now registered under the Heritage Property Act (Nova Scotia). The property is located in Georges River, Nova Scotia.

Farms in Canada
Heritage sites in Nova Scotia